OFC Oostzaan is a football club from Oostzaan, Netherlands. It competes in the Tweede Divisie since 2022.

History 
Oostzaan promoted to the Sunday Derde Divisie in 2016. In 2022, it promoted to the Tweede Divisie after winning a Tweede Divisie championship.

References

External links
 Official site

Football clubs in the Netherlands
Football clubs in North Holland
Sport in Oostzaan
Association football clubs established in 1932
1932 establishments in the Netherlands